Butleriana is a genus of moths in the family Geometridae described by Luis E. Parra in 1991.

Species
Butleriana minor Butler, 1882
Butleriana fasciata Butler, 1882
Butleriana fumosa Butler, 1882
Butleriana oculata Mabille, 1885

References

External links

Larentiinae